Mbu, or Ajumbu, is a Southern Bantoid language of Cameroon. It is traditionally classified as a Western Beboid language, but that has not been demonstrated to be a valid family. Inasmuch as Western Beboid may be valid, Mbu would appear to be the most divergent of its languages.

"Mbu" is the name of the village the language is spoken in.

Phonology 

There are three tones; high, mid, and low.

References

 Blench, Roger, 2011. 'The membership and internal structure of Bantoid and the border with Bantu'. Bantu IV, Humboldt University, Berlin.
Good, Jeff, & Jesse Lovegren. 2009. 'Reassessing Western Beboid'. Bantu III.
Good, Jeff, & Scott Farrar. 2008. 'Western Beboid and African language classification'. LSA.

External links 
 ELAR archive of Ajumbu language documentation materials

Beboid languages
Languages of Cameroon